St Nicolas's Church, Kings Norton, is the Anglican parish church of Kings Norton, in the Diocese of Birmingham, West Midlands, United Kingdom.

History
A church has been located on this site as early as the 11th century when the Normans built a small, rectangular chapel. It is not known if this was the result of a rebuild of a previous church. A church on this site has been recorded in documents since 1213. The current St Nicolas's Church dates from the early 13th century, and the spire was constructed between 1446 and 1475. The Norman building was demolished in the 14th century when a new nave, both aisles and the chancel arch were constructed. In the 17th century, almost the whole of the south aisle was re-built, the chancel was re-roofed and the low pitched roof that covered the nave from the 15th century was replaced by a much steeper version. Both north aisle and south aisle were given four separate, high pitched roofs set side by side. A parish was assigned to the church in 1846.

The church was restored in 1863 by Ewan Christian and again in 1871 by W. J. Hopkins. It is a Grade I listed building.

In 1898 the church started a mission in Cotteridge which later became St Agnes' Church, Cotteridge.

The Revd W. V. Awdry, author of The Railway Series including Thomas the Tank Engine was a curate from 1940 to 1946. The church stands next to the historic buildings of Saracen's Head, recently restored and named Saint Nicolas Place. On 11 October 2021 a plaque was unveiled inside the church bearing an engraving of Thomas.

Churchyard
The churchyard, which has been extended to the west and (across a private road) to the north, contains war graves of eleven service personnel of World War I and seven of World War II.

List of vicars and rectors

1313 Roger Notte,
???? Richard de la Fielde,
???? John Le Tournour
1325 Robert de Clyve
1344 William Paas
1346-75 Reginald Newton
1476 John Shyngler
1496-1512 William Dowell
1504 Machell Thomas
1513 Humphrey Toye
1523 Thomas Heregreve
1540 Edward Alcock
???? Henry Locock
???? William Gardefielde
1547 Richard Dewhurst
1552 John Butler
1609-11 Henry Kempster
1616 Nathaniel Bradshaw
1623-39 Tobias Gyles
1640-62 Thomas Hall
1662 William Collins
1663-70 John Horton
1673-75 Timothy White
1676-78 John Guest
1678-84 John Birch
1686-96 John Barney
1696-98 Thomas Wilmot
1699-1717 John Birch
1718-21 Thomas Gem
1722-23 John Birch
1726-30 Joseph Benton
1730-34 John Hancox
1735-39 Richard Carpenter
1741-43 John Waldron
1744-49 S. Collins
1752-61 James Hemming
1762-70 John Hodges
1771-83 Thomas Edwards
1784-1824 Hugh Edwards
1824-59 Joseph Amphlett
1859-80 J. M. L. Aston
1880-93 Digby Henry Cotes-Preedy
1893-1909 Charles William Barnard
1909-23 Hugh Price
1924-48 Thomas Shelton Dunn
1949-65 Edward George Ashford
1965-79 Anthony James Balmforth
1979-92 William Beadon Norman
1992-99 Martin Leigh
1999-2015 Rob Morris
2016–present Larry Wright

Bells
The ringing chamber is accessed via a wooden staircase of 54 steps.

The ringing practice takes place every Tuesday from 19:45 to 21:00, and Sunday service ringing is from 09:50 to 10:30

There is a poem "The New Bell Wake" about these bells.

Organ

Parts of the organ date from 1857 by J. Halmshaw, but it has been expanded and restored several times since. A specification of the organ can be found on the National Pipe Organ Register.

List of organists
1857 Henry Halmshaw
1884 Charles Thompson
1893 Herbert Walter Wareing
1907 A. W. Hartland
1925 John Birch
1927 J. W. Brittain
1927 W. Sudworth
1941 W. R. Masters
1950 Mr. Brown
1950 David Gwerfyl Davies (later organist of Brecon Cathedral)
1953 Dennis Davenport
1960 Raymond Isaacson
1961 B. W. Purchase
1972 Peter Boswell
1976 Peter Carder
1993 Sylvia Fox

List of assistant organists
1928 W. R. Masters
1941 W. E. Moore
1950 J. Myers
1958 R. G. Howells
1961 Trevor Jones
1968 Reginald Hall
1974 Martin Schellenberg (later Assistant Organist of Bristol Cathedral and then Director of Music (Organist & Master of the Choir) at Christchurch Priory)
1978 Andrew Lane
1980 Ceridwen Evans
1990 Sylvia Fox
1998 Kevin Blumer

See also

Listed buildings in Birmingham

Other Medieval churches in Birmingham
St Laurence's Church, Northfield 
St Edburgha's Church, Yardley
St Giles' Church, Sheldon

References

External links
 The King’s Norton Parish Web Site

Church of England church buildings in Birmingham, West Midlands
Grade I listed churches in the West Midlands (county)
Grade I listed buildings in Birmingham
14th-century church buildings in England
Ewan Christian buildings